Ward Hayden and the Outliers, formerly known as Girls, Guns and Glory (GGG), is a band from Boston, Massachusetts. They currently release music independently but formerly had signed with Lonesome Day Records and released albums with Sony RED, MRI and Dry Lightning Records in the US, as well as through Proper in the UK and Rough Trade in Europe. Their music is a mix of old school country, early rock 'n' roll, blues, and country rock. Inspiration is taken from Hank Williams, Johnny Cash and Johnny Horton classics. Ward Hayden and the Outliers has garnered seven Boston Music Awards (BMA). They were the 2011 winner of the BMA for "Americana Artist of the Year", and were nominated in the "Live Artist of the Year" category. They were also the 2019 winner of the BMA for "Country Artist of the Year". The band is popular throughout Europe and Scandinavia and has toured there for several years. Their 2016 album Love and Protest was a top 5 album in Norway and peaked at #1 on the Norway country album charts.

The band has released seven studio albums and a live album, the two most recent being Can’t Judge a Book (2019) and Free Country (2021). Two more studio albums and one more live album are currently in the works for 2023 and 2024, including the studio album South Shore, set for release in early 2023.

History 

The band was formed in 2005 by vocalist/rhythm guitarist Ward Hayden and bassist Bruce Beagley, joined shortly afterward by lead guitarist Colin Toomey and drummer John Graham. Colt Thompson replaced Toomey in 2007. 2008 led to the bands third studio recording and their first Top 10 album "Inverted Valentine", which peaked at #8 on the Americana Music Association (AMA) Chart. It was the highest charting album by an Independent band that year and led to the band being courted by numerous Major and Independent record labels in the US and Europe.

After re-releasing "Inverted Valentine" with label support in 2009, the band embarked on two years of non-stop touring, racking up close to 200 shows a year in 2009 and 2010. During this time the band toured with Yarn, Lake Street Dive, Della Mae, Bill Kirchen, Eilen Jewell, Bobby Bare Jr, Trampled By Turtles, Drag The River, and Slim Cessna's Auto Club.

By 2010, Hayden was the sole original member left in the band, with Boston-based guitarist Chris Hersch and bassist Paul Dilley joining. A second guitarist, Joe Keffler, also toured with the band in 2010. By 2012, Josh Kiggans became the band's third drummer replacing Michael Calabrese, also of the Boston-based band Lake Street Dive. In 2014, Rolling Stone included the band in its list of the top 10 new country artists that fall.  Rolling Stone also reviewed the band's live Hank Williams tribute album.

Their third album, 2011's Sweet Nothings featured a collaboration (the song "1000 Times") with local Massachusetts alternative country musician Sarah Borges. In 2011, the band opened for Wanda Jackson.

In 2016, Hersch left the band and was replaced later that year by Cody Nilsen. Also in 2016, the band decided to release new music independently, beginning with the album Love and Protest. The album featured local Massachusetts sideman Duke Levine as guest lead guitarist because it was recorded between Hersch's departure and Nilsen's arrival.   The band also featured a touring lead guitarist during this time. After Nilsen joined the band, they opened for NRBQ.

In 2018, the band dropped the name Girls, Guns and Glory because of the polarizing issue of gun control in the United States.  Also in 2018, the band opened for The Oak Ridge Boys, Marty Stuart & His Fabulous Superlatives, Los Lobos, and Dwight Yoakam.

Their seventh studio album, Can't Judge A Book, mostly featuring covers, some of which were re-imagined by the band, has recently been released. Also in 2019, the band opened for Midland.

In 2021, the band opened for Los Lobos for a second time.

In 2023, while Nilsen worked as a guitar tech for the Dropkick Murphys, Ryan Hommel temporarily sat in with the band on lead guitar.  In early 2023, the band's next studio album, South Shore, will be released, with another studio album and another Hank Williams tribute live album scheduled to follow later in 2023 and in 2024.

Members

Current members
 Ward Hayden — lead vocals, rhythm guitar, double bass, drums (2005–present)
 Josh Kiggans — drums, mandolin, percussion, piano, vocals (2012–present)
 Cody Nilsen — vocals, lead guitar, pedal steel guitar, dobro, slide guitar, baritone guitar (2016–present)
 Greg Hall – vocals, bass (2020–present)

Former members
 Bruce Beagley — bass guitar (2005-2008)
 John Graham — drums (2005-2009)
 Colin Toomey – lead guitar (2006)
 Brendan Murphy – percussion (2006)
 Colt Thompson — harmony and backing vocals, lead guitar, rhythm guitar (2007-2010)
 Justin Maxwell — bass guitar, double bass (2009-2010)
 Michael Calabrese — drums (2009-2012)
 Chris Hersch — vocals, lead guitar, banjo (2010-2016)
 Joe Keffler – rhythm guitar (2010)
 Paul Dilley — vocals, bass guitar, double bass, lead guitar, piano, Mellotron, drums, mandolin (2010–2020)

Timeline

Discography

2000s

 Fireworks & Alcohol (2006)
 Pretty Little Wrecking Ball (2007)
 Inverted Valentine (2008)

2010s

2020’s
 Free Country (2021)
 South Shore (2023; to be released)

References

External links
 www.wardhaydenandtheoutliers.com
www.girlsgunsandglory.com (former website, until 2018)

Further reading
10 new artists you need to know: Girls Guns and Glory (Rolling Stone)
Girls Guns & Glory Drink Their Way Through Christmas in New Video (Rolling Stone)
A little bit country, a little bit rock 'n' roll (The Boston Globe)
Band gets shout-out from Ochocinco (The Boston Globe)
Noisy Neighbors: Review of 'Sweet Nothings' (The Boston Globe)
Music Review: Revamped Girls Guns & Glory bring it on home (The Patriot Ledger)
Hear Girls Guns & Glory Honor Hank Williams on New Tribute Album (Rolling Stone)
Girls Guns And Glory: Sweet Nothings, CD review (The Daily Telegraph)
The Best Country Music of 2011 (PopMatters)
Songs You Need To Hear: Girls Guns and Glory, 'Baby’s Got A Dream' (American Songwriter)
#1 Country Album in Norway 2016: Girls Guns & Glory "Love and Protest" (Rootsy)

American alternative country musicians
American country rock groups
Americana music groups
Musical groups from Boston